Charisma josephi, common name the Joseph's charisma, is a species of extremely small sea snail, a marine gastropod mollusk in the family Trochidae, the top snails.

Description
The diameter of the shell is 3 mm. The thick shell is widely umbilicated and obliquely turbinate. Its color is white, opaque, maculated with very pale chestnut. The five whorls are rounded and closely spirally striate. The thick peristome is posteriorly produced.

Distribution
This marine species is endemic to Australia and occurs off South Australia, Tasmania, Victoria and Western Australia

References

 Tenison-Woods, J.E. 1877. On some new Tasmanian marine shells. Papers and Proceedings of the Royal Society of Tasmania 1876: 131-159
 Tate, R. & May, W.L. 1901. A revised census of the marine Mollusca of Tasmania. Proceedings of the Linnean Society of New South Wales 26(3): 344-471
 Cotton, B.C. 1945. Southern Australian Gastropoda. Part 1. Streptoneura. Transactions of the Royal Society of South Australia 69(1): 150-171
 Cotton, B.C. 1959. South Australian Mollusca. Archaeogastropoda. Handbook of the Flora and Fauna of South Australia. Adelaide : South Australian Government Printer 449 pp

External links
To World Register of Marine Species

josephi
Gastropods of Australia
Gastropods described in 1877